The University of Nottingham operates from four campuses in Nottinghamshire and from two overseas campuses, one in Ningbo, China and the other in Semenyih, Malaysia. The Ningbo campus was officially opened on 23 February 2005 by the then British Deputy Prime Minister, John Prescott, in the presence of Chinese education minister Zhou Ji and State Counsellor Chen Zhili. The Malaysia campus was the first purpose-built UK university campus in a foreign country and was officially opened by Najib Tun Razak on 26 September 2005. Najib Tun Razak, as well as being a Nottingham alumnus, was Deputy Prime Minister of Malaysia at the time and has since become Prime Minister of Malaysia.

University Park Campus and Jubilee Campus are situated a few miles from the centre of Nottingham, with the small King's Meadow Campus nearby. Sutton Bonington Campus is situated 12 miles (19 km) south of the central campuses, near the village of Sutton Bonington.

University Park Campus

University Park Campus is the main campus of the university.  A few miles from the centre of Nottingham, the 330 acres (1.3 km2) site is one of the largest university campuses in the United Kingdom, and home to the majority of the university's 43,561 students. The campus contains 12 halls of residence, of which the largest is Hugh Stewart Hall, as well as academic and administrative buildings.  The campus contains 13 listed buildings.

Gardens
Of particular note are the formal Jekyll Garden, allegedly designed by Gertrude Jekyll, next to Lenton and Wortley Hall; the walled Highfield Garden near the Trent Building, which is home to the national collection of Canna; and the Millennium Garden, formally opened on 4 July 2000. In addition there is extensive planting elsewhere on campus, particularly in lakeside Highfields Park. The campus also has a number of green roofs as part of the Garden in the Sky Project and University wide goal to be more sustainable. These can be found at The Orchard Hotel, Maths Building and George Green library.

University Park Campus halls of residence

 Ancaster Hall
 Cavendish Hall
 Cripps Hall
 Derby Hall
 Florence Boot Hall
 Hugh Stewart Hall
 Lenton and Wortley Hall
 Lincoln Hall
 Nightingale Hall
 Rutland Hall
 Sherwood Hall
 Willoughby Hall

Notable buildings

Trent Building

The Trent Building serves as one of the main administrative buildings of the University of Nottingham.  It also contains academic facilities, principally for the arts and social sciences.

The foundation stone was laid on 14 June 1922 by Richard Haldane, 1st Viscount Haldane. London architect Morley Horder created the Trent Building in the classical architectural style.  The building is topped by a campanile (clock tower), is built of Portland stone and is protected as a grade II listed building. King George V and Queen Mary presided at the building's opening on 10 July 1928,  

The building's Great Hall has hosted many distinguished visitors, including Albert Einstein, Mahatma Gandhi and Queen Elizabeth II.

The writer D. H. Lawrence described the building as looking like an "iced cake".

It gained its Trent Building name in 1953 when the adjacent Portland Building was opened. 

The main buildings of the university's campuses in China and Malaysia are both modelled on University Park's iconic Trent Building. In the case of the China campus this includes an exact replica of the clock tower.

Hallward Library

The Hallward Library is the principal library of the University of Nottingham. It was designed by the architect Harry Faulkner-Brown and won the RIBA East Midlands Regional Award for Architecture prize in 1974.  It is named after Dr Bertrand Hallward, first vice-chancellor of the university.

The contractors were W.J. Simms, Sons and Cooke Ltd. Construction started in 1971 and it opened in December 1973. It was designed to hold 500,000 volumes and construction cost £805,000 .

It houses the university's arts, humanities, law and social sciences collections and a European Documentation Centre.

Portland Building

The Portland Building is faced with Portland stone but is actually named after William Arthur Henry Cavendish-Bentinck, 7th Duke of Portland, who was the university's second chancellor. 

The plans for the building were drawn up in 1948 but post war restrictions on capital expenditure delayed the start of construction work until March 1953. It was opened by David Maxwell Fyfe, 1st Earl of Kilmuir, Lord Chancellor, on 26 October 1956.

It houses the University of Nottingham Students' Union, Impact Magazine, URN and NSTV.

Other notable buildings

Coates Building, architect Basil Spence
Chemistry Building architect Basil Spence and partners 1961
Creative Energy Homes
D.H. Lawrence Lakeside Pavilion, architects Marsh Grochowski 1998-2001
Djanogly Arts Centre and Recital Hall, architect Graham Brown 1989-92
East Midlands Conference Centre
Electrical and Electronic Engineering Department Tower, architects Andrew Renton and Associates, 1963-65
George Green Science Library, architects Andrew Renton and Associates, 1961-64.
Highfield House built for Joseph Lowe by architect William Wilkins the Elder, 1797-8. Grade II listed 
Institute for Pharmaceutical Science, architects Pick Everard 1998-99
Lenton Abbey, for James Green, the superintendent engineer of the Nottingham and Grantham Canal 1798-1800 Grade II listed 
Lenton Eaves, for Benjamin Walker Jnr, a lacemaker, 1875
Lenton Firs, built 1800 for Thomas Wright Watson a Nottingham hosiery manufacturer, remodelled by Thomas Chambers Hine 1862, Evans and Jolley 1888, and Evans and Son 1904
Lenton Grove, (Department of History) ca. 1825 for Francis Evans, a Nottingham attorney Grade II listed 
Lenton House, (guest accommodation for the Boots Company) ca. 1800 built for Matthew Needham, a master hosier. Grade II listed 
Lenton House Lodge, ca. 1800. Grade II listed 
Lenton Hurst, built for William Goodacre Player by architects Arthur George Marshall and George Turner, 1896
Lenton Mount (now University Club), for William Sidney Hemsley, a lace and hosiery manufacturer by architect William Dymock Pratt 1906-07
Lodges (West and East) by Percy Morley Horder 1932. Both Grade II listed.
Paton House, originally West Hill House for Samuel Herrick Sands JP by architects Evans and Jolley 1881
Physics and Mathematics Building architect Basil Spence and partners 1961-63
Pope Building, architect Basil Spence
Redcourt, architects Martin and Hardy.
School of Pharmacy, architects Renton Howard Wood Associates 1967
Social Sciences and Education building, architect Donald McMorran 1960-61
The Orchards, for Alfred Thomas Richard, managing director of Imperial Laundry of Radford Boulevard by architect William Dymock Pratt 1904

Jubilee Campus

Jubilee Campus primarily houses the School of Education, the School of Computer Science, and the Nottingham University Business School. The campus is also the location of the National College for School Leadership and the university's Global Engagement Office.

The campus opened in 1999, and is located about a mile to the east of the main University Park Campus on the site of the former Raleigh Bicycle Company factory.  The campus plan and the buildings for first phase of the campus were designed by the architects Michael Hopkins and Partners following selection through an architectural design competition managed by RIBA Competitions and won the 2000 BCI Award for "Building of the Year" and the 2001 RIBA Journal Sustainability Award.  The campus name derives from the fact that 1998 was the Golden Jubilee of the granting of the Royal Charter that made the university an independent degree-granting organisation.

Like the University Park Campus Jubilee has been constructed around an artificial lake and with similar green surroundings.  The Hopkins buildings also contains many innovative environmental elements such as living roofs (Sedum) aiding storm drainage, insulation and promoting biodiversity, and solar panels.  Particularly striking is the library, the Sir Harry and Lady Djanogly Learning Resource Centre, a circular building situated in the middle of the lake with only one, spiraling, floor.

For the second phase of the campus, Make Architects were retained by the university. They produced a revised campus plan, which moved away from Hopkins' north–south orientation, and creates an east–west axis beyond the confines of the site. The first stage includes a group of three prominent buildings by the practice.

The new plan is centred on the Aspire sculpture, designed by Make Architects, which was the country's tallest piece of free-standing art until the construction of Orbit in 2012.

International House and the Amenity Building have facades in multiple shades of red terracotta, whereas the Gateway Building is covered in galvanized zinc shingles.  Critical reception to Make's buildings for the second phase has been mixed.  The new campus buildings were runner up for Building Design magazine's 2009 Carbuncle Cup.

The GlaxoSmithKline Carbon Neutral Laboratory for Sustainable Chemistry is the UK's first carbon neutral laboratory. The lab is built from natural materials and opened on 27 February 2017. During the construction of the lab a large fire broke out on 12 September 2014 and burnt the building down, resulting in a delay of completion.

Jubilee Campus halls of residence

 Newark Hall – undergraduate, 400 students
 Southwell Hall – undergraduate, 200 students
 Melton Hall – postgraduate, 140 students

Each of the above halls are ensuite, and Southwell and Newark are catered.  Many students studying on the main campus live in halls on Jubilee.  Transport between campuses is provided by a university-funded bus.

King's Meadow Campus

 
King's Meadow Campus is a 16 acres (64,750 m2) campus that was formerly the East Midlands studios of Carlton Central.  The university's department of Manuscripts and Special Collections is now housed at the King's Meadow Campus. Information Services, Human Resources and much of the Finance Department are now also housed at this site.

Sutton Bonington Campus

The Sutton Bonington Campus is a site of the University of Nottingham, and houses the School of Biosciences and the School of Veterinary Medicine and Science. The campus is a 420-hectare (4.2 km2) site situated in a rural location near Sutton Bonington village, 12 miles (19 km) south of the main, University Park Campus, and 1 mile (2 km) from Junction 24 of the M1 motorway.  The campus has its own crest and motto: Aras . Seris . Metis. The campus contains research buildings and teaching facilities, a large library and is also home to Bonington Halls, the university's largest hall of residence, which accommodates around 650 students (in reality it is a series of small halls rather than one big hall - the name has recently changed to reflect this).  A 400 hectare (4 km2) commercial farm, University Farm, and a dairy are also part of the site.

The Barn, a student amenities building which opened in 2014, accommodates the student bar, student service centre, refectory, Graduate School hub, faith spaces and a private dining room. There is also a cafe, 'The Mulberry Tree', shop and two cashpoint machines on campus. Joint funding from the university and HEFCE has enabled the opening of a teaching laboratory named the Peter Buttery Teaching Laboratory after a former head of the Division of Nutritional Sciences.

Sports facilities include a gym, a sports hall, and an astro-turf pitch. External sports facilities run alongside the university between the main road and the railway line. There is also a renovated squash court which is now a music room available to students in 'Music Soc' and a bouldering wall available to students in 'SB Climbing'.

The campus was formerly the Midlands Agricultural and Dairy College before merging with the University of Nottingham in 1947. The college was originally located in Kingston on Soar, about a two-minute walk down the road from the current campus, but relocated to its current location after the First World War. The site (which had been built but not yet occupied prior to the war) was used as a prisoner-of-war camp during the First World War. It was from there that a group of 21 German officers, led by Captain Karl von Müller, escaped through a tunnel dug from one of the huts.  15 tonnes of soil are said to have been removed and hidden under the tiers of a lecture room.  All but one of the prisoners were recaptured.

The campus has long been home to the School of Biosciences (previously School of Agriculture, School of Environmental and Life Sciences) which teaches students studying biological subjects encompassing animal science, food science, agriculture, nutrition and plant science and the University of Nottingham opened the doors of its School of Veterinary Medicine and Science in September 2006, the first vet school to open in the UK in over fifty years. In its first year, there were 96 students attending the faculty on its five-year course, but the number has grown, with 110 students having been admitted more recently. There is now also a six-year program which includes a preliminary year to teach basic biology and chemistry relevant to the degree. This has been set up with the aim of encouraging more people to do the subject by making it available to those with a degree that is not relevant, or without biology and chemistry A-level.

Student organisations
The Sutton Bonington Campus is the home of the Sutton Bonington Students' Union Guild, an association of the University of Nottingham Students' Union. All officers of the 'SB Guild' are non-sabbatical and elected annually by an anonymous ballot, which follows the Students' Union procedure of using STV. The Guild used to be separate from the union, and still has a degree of independence. The Guild run 40 of its own clubs and societies. In addition it also has its own international students organisation (ISSB). Societies at Sutton Bonington Campus are student-run and apply directly to the Guild for funding- they are also separate from the main university societies in many cases.

The old students association for both the campus, and the hall of residence is known as OKA (the Old Kingstonian Association, the name pre-dating the move to Sutton Bonington), and its members include both students from the Midlands Agricultural and Dairy College, and from the university. OKA produces a publication known as Agrimag annually (and has done so since at least the 1920s, when it was called the M.A.D.C Magazine). OKA organises a reunion weekend on the third weekend in November every year for recently graduated students to return.

Bonington Student Village
Bonington Student Village is the name given by the current provider to the University's halls of residence at Sutton Bonington. It is a mixed sex group of houses and halls, holding both undergraduates and postgraduates, of varying age and design holding between eight and sixty people. Bonington Student Village houses approximately 650 students and is managed by Campus Living Villages (CLV). The houses and halls at Sutton Bonington are named after local villages and are as follows:
 Kingston
 Normanton
 Wymeswold
 Ratcliffe
 Rempstone
 Kegworth
 Dishley
 Hathern
 Lockington
 Zouch
 Stanford
 Barton
 Costock
 Thrumpton

School of Veterinary Medicine and Science

Nottingham Vet School was the first brand new, purpose-built veterinary school in the UK for over 50 years and opened in 2006. The academic staff of the School work within 5 strategic research areas: Infection and Immunity; Population Health and Welfare; Comparative Medicine; Reproductive Biology and Veterinary Educational Research. Research is closely aligned with that in the School of Biosciences with whom some research facilities and equipment are shared.  The involvement of Clinical Associates and other organisations within the research programs enables the identification of clinical problems in the field and the rapid application of investigational science to these problems in both production and companion animal species. The Foundation Dean and Head of School is Professor Gary England.

School of Biosciences
The School of Biosciences (previously School of Agriculture) predates the School of Veterinary Medicine and Science on the Sutton Bonington Campus by several decades. It has a reputation for excellence in teaching and world-leading research, particularly in food, plant and crop science. Current strengths lie in soil and root biology, plant science and dairy science. The School has 95 academic staff, 925 undergraduate students and 300 post-graduate students, The School houses five divisions:

Division of Agricultural and Environmental Sciences
 Division of Animal Science
 Division of Food, Nutrition and Dietetics
 Division of Microbiology, Brewing and Biotechnology
 Division of Plant and Crop Sciences

The Head of School is  Professor Paul Wilson. Past Heads of Schools include Simon Langley-Evans, Neil Crout, Katharine Smart, Jerry Roberts, Robert Webb, Don Grierson and Peter Buttery.

University Farm
The farm exists to provide facilities, resources and opportunities for research with crops and animals. It also has a key educational role by providing an environment for effective tuition of students in Biosciences, and Veterinary science. The farm is run commercially to be self-financing whilst still fulfilling its role as a teaching and research resource. The farm manager is currently Jon Clatworthy. The farm is a 400 hectare mixed farm, with an emphasis on dairy and arable production.

The dairy herd consists of 180 cows, which are milked using a robot milking system (part of a recent 2 million-pound investment in the dairy). The farm also has 350 breeding ewes, and maintains beef, pig and poultry research units.

320 Hectares are devoted to arable crops including cereals and oilseed rape, 20 Hectares of which have been converted to organic production. The further 80 hectares of land is used for an intensively managed rotation of grass, fodder crops and maize for silage.

History
The first foundations of the current site at Sutton Bonington date back to the founding of the Midland Dairy Institute in the mid-19th century. The institute gave lectures and short coursers in such subjects as butter and cheese production, the institute had no fixed home but instead toured the various agricultural shows in the area. University College Nottingham was founded in 1877, and in 1892 co-operated with Nottingham County Council in establishing an agricultural department. Then in 1895 the Midland Dairy Institute in conjunction with the five County Councils of Nottingham, Derby, Leicester, Kesteven and Lindsey, agreed to join forces, in an effort to provide both theoretical and practical instruction in agriculture, and especially dairying. In 1900 the agricultural department of Nottingham University College was combined with the Dairy institute at Kingston, and additional buildings were erected shortly afterwards. In 1905 the institute changed its name to the Midland Agricultural and Dairy College.

Initially intended for an experimental station. It however became apparent that the institute was rapidly running out of space, and construction of a brand new purpose-built site at Sutton Bonington began. The construction of the new site had not been completed before the outbreak of the First World War, and the new buildings were appropriated by the government to house German prisoners of war. The college did not regain the site at Sutton Bonington until 1919 and did not fully transfer to the new site until 1928. During the 1930s the college started to offer degree level courses in association with University College Nottingham and London University. As the Second World War started the college was once again appropriated, this time to be used as a training centre for the Women's Land Army (WLA). After a year, however, it was decided that it was unnecessary to provide this level of training, and the college was returned to its original purpose.

In 1947–48 the college merged with Nottingham University College, to form the new Nottingham University (which was granted its charter in 1948), Sutton Bonington was initially home to two of the university's six faculties (Agriculture and Horticulture). This move was part of a major shift in the teaching of agricultural sciences in the region. Each of the original local authorities set up their own agricultural college to teach practical agriculture:
 Brackenhurst College, Nottinghamshire (now part of Nottingham Trent University)
 Broomfield College, Derbyshire (now part of Derby College)
 Brooksby College, Leicestershire (now part of Brooksby-Melton College)
 Caythorpe College, Kesteven (closed 2001)
 Riseholme College, Lindsey (now part of Lincoln University),
In the meantime the new faculties at Sutton Bonington quickly phased out practical courses and instead focused on academic research and graduate and post-graduate teaching. It was initially intended that the new colleges would feed their brightest and most able students into the new university.

The site at Sutton Bonington continued to grow during the latter part of the 20th century, during this period the two initial faculties were merged into one: the faculty of Agricultural and Food Sciences. The end of the 20th century saw the faculty initially merged with the faculty of Biology to form the School of Biology. At the time this was seen as a move to transfer the biology department from University Park to Sutton Bonington, in a move designed to free up much needed building land, the university however denied that this was their motive. Shortly after the purchase of the new Jubilee Campus, the school was split into the School of life sciences (based at University Park) and the School of Biosciences (based at Sutton Bonington). This period also saw the construction of new Plant and Food science buildings at Sutton Bonington.

2006 saw the opening of the School of Veterinary Medicine and Science on the campus, in brand new purpose-built buildings. This was the first new vet school in the UK for over 50 years, and was seen to be part of the government's response to the 2001 foot and mouth epidemic. Controversially, the building of the new school was partly funded by leasing out the halls of residence, catering facilities, bar and shop, to private companies (CRM and Sodexo).

Sutton Bonington  weather station
Since 1908 Sutton Bonington has had an official (Met Office listed) automatic weather monitoring station situated on the university campus.

Climate
The warmest months are July and August, with average highs of just over 21 °C, whilst the coldest month is January, with a temperature range of 1.2 °C to 6.9 °C. Maximum and minimum temperatures throughout the year are around the England average. The highest temperature recorded at Sutton Bonington was 34.8 °C on 3 August 1990, a temperature that was unbeaten in the heatwave of 2003. Frost occurs typically between November and April, with an average of 48 days a year with frost recorded. The sunniest months are July, August and May (in that order).

The driest months are May, February and July (in that order).

Below are average temperature and rainfall figures taken between 1981 and 2010 for the official weather station at the Sutton Bonington campus itself.

Gallery

See also
University of Nottingham Medical School
University of Nottingham Medical School at Derby

References

External links

 Official website
  Photographs of The Jubilee Campus, including the Aspire Tower from Nottingham21
 Jubilee Campus Nottingham — a collection of photographs and slide show

Nottingham
University of Nottingham
University of Nottingham
Grade II listed buildings in Nottinghamshire
Grade II listed educational buildings